The Latimer Cabin is a historic site in Panama City Beach, Florida.  It is located at the northeast shore of Powell Lake. On September 15, 2004, it was added to the U.S. National Register of Historic Places.

References

External links
 Bay County listings at National Register of Historic Places

Houses in Bay County, Florida
National Register of Historic Places in Bay County, Florida